Defecation is a deathgrind side project formed by Righteous Pigs guitarist Mitch Harris and ex-Napalm Death drummer Mick Harris in 1987. Mitch Harris was the guitarist, bassist and vocalist while Mick Harris was the drummer and vocalist as well, until Mick left the group shortly after their first album Purity Dilution was released.

Biography
Before Defecation started, Mick was the drummer for Napalm Death, and Mitch was the guitarist for Righteous Pigs. The two were pen pals and decided to start the project. They formed Defecation in 1987 and released Purity Dilution on Nuclear Blast Records in 1989. Shortly after the release of Purity Dilution, Mick left the band, as well as Napalm Death in 1991. Mitch Harris and Jesse Pintado joined Napalm Death, and Defecation was put on hold for a while. Fourteen years after the first album was recorded, Mitch made the second album completely by himself, entitled Intention Surpassed.

In 2019, Spanish label Metal Bastard Enterprises used the band's name and logo to promote a musically unrelated scam artist's album named Killing with Kindness; the album was marketed by the label as Defecation's new album, tricking many fans into acquiring it, to extremely negative reception. Mitch Harris latter issued a statement on Napalm Death's Facebook page in which he confirmed that neither he nor Mick Harris have recorded this album, while also apologizing for anyone who bought it.

Discography
 1989: Purity Dilution
 2003: Intention Surpassed

References

External links
 Nuclear Blast page

Deathgrind musical groups
Heavy metal duos
Musical groups established in 1987
Musical groups from Birmingham, West Midlands
Musical groups disestablished in 1992
Nuclear Blast artists
English musical duos